Decena is a surname. Notable people with the surname include:
Arturo Guzmán Decena (1976-2002), Mexican officer
Eduardo Decena (1926-2002), Filipino basketball player
Edwin Decena, American film director

Spanish-language surnames